Steven Pace (born 6 March 1983) is an Australian footballer who plays for Heidelberg United FC.

Club career
Earlier in his career, Pace played for various Victorian teams, including South Melbourne, Essendon Royals and the Preston Lions. He has been described as a "utility" player, having played as a midfielder as well as a central defender. He played in the latter position for the Preston Lions in their successful 2007 campaign, when they won the Victorian Premier League Championship.

When the Melbourne Victory signed Pace in October 2007, coach Ernie Merrick said about him:
"Steven reads the game well, has excellent speed, good distribution and possesses great maturity"
He made his first appearance for the Melbourne Victory against the Central Coast Mariners on 4 November 2007. Pace departed the Victory in 2010, making 8 league appearances in his time there.

After leaving Victory, Pace joined Hume City FC and spent the following four and a half years with the Broadmeadows-based club.

In 2015, Pace joined Heidelberg United FC.

Honours
With Melbourne Victory:
  A-League Championship: 2008-2009
  A-League Premiership: 2008-2009
  National Premier Leagues Victoria 2007

With Heidelberg United FC:
 National Premier Leagues Victoria Premiers 2017
 Dockerty Cup 2017

References

External links
 Melbourne Victory profile
 Oz Football profile

1983 births
Living people
Australian people of Maltese descent
Australian soccer players
A-League Men players
National Soccer League (Australia) players
Melbourne Victory FC players
South Melbourne FC players
Hume City FC players
Preston Lions FC players
Victorian Institute of Sport alumni
Association football defenders
Soccer players from Melbourne